A588 may refer to:

 A588 road (Great Britain), a road in the United Kingdom
 A type of Weathering steel
 The Chrysler Neon engine#A588